Pultenaea parviflora, sommonly known as Sydney bush-pea, is a species of flowering plant in the family Fabaceae and is endemic to eastern New South Wales. It is usually a small, erect shrub with wedge-shaped to narrow egg-shaped leaves with the narrower end towards the base, and clusters of yellow to orange and red flowers.

Description
The edges of the leaves curve upwards and the tip is turned downwards. The standard petal is yellow to orange with red markings, the wings yellow to orange and the keel yellow to red.

Taxonomy and naming
Pultenaea parviflora was first formally described in 1825 by Augustin Pyramus de Candolle in Prodromus Systematis Naturalis Regni Vegetabilis from an unpublished description by Franz Sieber. The specific epithet (parviflora) means "small-flowered".

Distribution and habitat
Sydney bush-pea grows in heathy woodland on the Cumberland Plain, mostly between Windsor, Penrith and Dean Park, west of Sydney in eastern New South Wales.

Conservation status
Pultenaea parviflora is classified as "vulnerable" under the Australian Government Environment Protection and Biodiversity Conservation Act 1999 and as "endangered" the New South Wales Government Biodiversity Conservation Act 2016. The main threats to the species include habitat loss, weed invasion, inappropriate fire regimes and illegal dumping of waste.

Use in horticulture
Sydney bush-pea is only occasionally grown in gardens but forms a small, bushy shrub in a sunny position. It grows best in well-drained soil and tolerates moderate frost. Propagation is from scarified seed or from cuttings.

References

parviflora
Flora of New South Wales
Plants described in 1825
Taxa named by Augustin Pyramus de Candolle